The Moymirid dynasty (Latin: Moimarii, Czech and Slovak: Mojmírovci) was a Moravian ruling dynasty that ruled over Moravia in the 9th and early 10th century. On one hand, it is named after the first known member, Mojmir I, but on the other hand the Latin form of the dynasty's name is first mentioned in a letter from the year 900.

The last known members presumably died in the first decade of the 10th century during one of the invasions of Hungarian tribes. The developments of the family before Mojmír I and after 906 are unknown.

Known members

Disputed members
Pribina 
Predslav

References 

Moravian noble families
Great Moravia